Sir John Pickersgill Rodger,  (12 February 1851 – 19 September 1910) was a British colonial administrator.

Early life
Rodger was born in 1851 at Marylebone in London, the second son of Sir Robert Rodger and his wife Sophia (née Pickersgill). His father was a landowner, magistrate and Justice of the Peace who purchased Hadlow Castle in Kent where the family lived, and was the High Sheriff of Kent in 1865. He was educated at Eton College, where he was in the cricket XI, and went up to Christ Church, Oxford in 1870.

Career
Rodger was called to the English Bar at the Inner Temple in 1877 but practised little in Britain and joined the Colonial Service. In 1882 he was appointed as the Chief Magistrate and Commissioner of Lands at Selangor and was the British resident of Pahang, Selangor and Perak, all in British Malaya, before being appointed as the Governor of the Gold Coast in 1904. He was influential in the development of infrastructure whilst in post in West Africa, including the building of a harbour at Accra and of beginning the building of a railway to serve the cocoa industry around Kumasi.

Rodger was appointed CMG in 1899 and knighted KCMG in 1904.

Cricket
Rodger was a cricketer who played one first-class match for Kent County Cricket Club in 1870 after leaving Eton, playing against an MCC side during Canterbury Cricket Week. He scored a total of seven runs in the match. Although he played some cricket at Oxford he did not make the University XI. He played club cricket for a variety of amateur sides, including MCC, Band of Brothers and the Gentlemen of Kent. His brother, William Rodger, also played for Kent.

Family
Rodger married Maria Tyser in 1872; the couple had one daughter. He died in September 1910 in London shortly after retiring from the Colonial Service due to ill health. He was aged 59.

References

External links
WorldStatesmen - Malaysia
Gold Coast Administrations
Victoria Institution

 

1851 births
1910 deaths
History of Perak
Administrators in British Malaya
Governors of the Gold Coast (British colony)
English cricketers
Kent cricketers
People educated at Eton College
Alumni of Christ Church, Oxford
Knights Commander of the Order of St Michael and St George